Momento may refer to:

 Momento (album), a 2007 bossa nova album by Bebel Gilberto
 Memento (film), a 2000 American film written and directed by Christopher Nolan
 El Momento, a 2010 reggaeton/Latin pop album by Jowell y Randy
 "Un Momento", a 2010 Latin house/synthpop song by Inna

See also
 Memento (disambiguation)